Aracana is a genus of deepwater boxfishes native to the coastal waters of Australia.

Species
There are currently 2 recognized species in this genus:
 Aracana aurita (G. Shaw, 1798) (Striped cowfish)
 Aracana ornata (J. E. Gray, 1838) (Ornate cowfish)

References

 
Fish of Australia
Taxa named by John Edward Gray
Marine fish genera